John Curtis may refer to:

Politics
John Curtis (burgess) (fl. 1659–1660), North American colonial British planter and politician
John Curtis (English politician) (c. 1751–1813), English Member of Parliament for Wells, 1782–1784 and Steyning, 1791–1794
John Curtis (Irish politician) (died 1775), Irish politician
John Curtis (Utah politician) (born 1960), member of the U.S. House of Representatives and former Mayor of Provo, Utah
John A. Curtis (1834–1913), member of the Virginia House of Delegates
John E. Curtis (1915–1999), American politician from the state of Alaska

Sports
John Curtis (baseball) (born 1948), American Major League Baseball pitcher, 1970–1984
John Curtis (cricketer) (1887–1972), English cricketer
John Curtis (footballer, born 1954), English former professional football player
John Curtis (footballer, born 1978), English professional football player
John Curtis (sailor) (born 1967), Canadian Olympic sailor

Religion
John Curtis (bishop) (1880–1962), missionary bishop in China, 1929–1950
Barry Curtis (bishop) (John Barry Curtis, born 1933), retired Anglican bishop in Canada

Others
John Curtis (entomologist) (1791–1862), English entomologist
John Curtis (painter) (fl. 1790–1797), English landscape painter
John B. Curtis (1827–1897), inventor of the first chewing gum prototype
John C. Curtis (1845–1917), American Civil War soldier and Medal of Honor recipient
John Green Curtis (1844–1913), American physiologist
John Thomas Curtis (1913–1961), American botanist and plant ecologist
John Curtis (games designer), designer of the Rolemaster game systems

See also
John Curtice (born 1953), British political scientist
Jack Curtis (disambiguation)
John Curteys (disambiguation)